Thutmose III (variously also spelt Tuthmosis or Thothmes), sometimes called Thutmose the Great, was the sixth pharaoh of the Eighteenth Dynasty. Officially, Thutmose III ruled Egypt for almost 54 years and his reign is usually dated from 28 April 1479 BC to 11 March 1425 BC, from the age of two and until his death at age fifty-six; however, during the first 22 years of his reign, he was coregent with his stepmother and aunt, Hatshepsut, who was named the pharaoh. While he was shown first on surviving monuments, both were assigned the usual royal names and insignia and neither is given any obvious seniority over the other. Thutmose served as the head of Hatshepsut's armies. During the final two years of his reign, he appointed his son and successor, Amenhotep II, as his junior co-regent. His firstborn son and heir to the throne, Amenemhat, predeceased Thutmose III. 

Becoming the sole ruling pharaoh of the kingdom after Hatshepsut's death, he conducted no fewer than 17 campaigns from Syria to Upper Nubia, expanding Egypt's empire to its largest extent. 

When Thutmose III died, he was buried in the Valley of the Kings, as were the rest of the kings from this period in Egypt. He is regarded, along with Ramesses II, as one of the two most powerful and celebrated rulers of the New Kingdom Period of Ancient Egypt, itself considered the height of Egyptian power.

Name 
Thutmose's two main names transliterate as mn-ḫpr-rˁ ḏḥwty-ms. The first name is usually transcribed as Menkheperre and means "Lasting is the manifestation of Ra" or "The lasting one of the manifestation of Ra". The second name is transliterated as Thutmose or Tuthmosis and means "Born of Thoth" or "Thoth is born".

Family

Thutmose III was the son of Thutmose II by a secondary wife, Iset (or Aset). His father's great royal wife was Queen Hatshepsut. Her daughter, Neferure, was Thutmose's half-sister.

When Thutmose II died, Thutmose III was too young to rule. Hatshepsut became his regent, soon his co-regent, and shortly thereafter declared herself to be the pharaoh while never denying kingship to Thutmose III. Thutmosis III had little power over the empire while Hatshepsut exercised the formal titulary of kingship. Her rule was quite prosperous and marked by great advancements. When Thutmose III reached a suitable age and demonstrated the capability, she appointed him to head her armies.

Some Egyptologists speculate that Thutmose married his half-sister, Neferure, but there is no conclusive evidence for this marriage. It has been suggested that Neferure, may have been the mother of Thutmose's firstborn son, Amenemhat. Alternatively, the Great Royal Wife Satiah is believed to have been the mother of Amenemhat. Amenemhat predeceased his father.

Several other wives of Thutmose are attested to by surviving records. He is known to have at least three foreign wives, Menwi, Merti, and Menhet, who were buried together. At least one other wife, Nebtu, is known from a pillar in Thutmose's tomb. Following the death of Satiah, a woman named Merytre-Hatshepsut became the Great Royal Wife. She was the mother of several of his children, including the future king Amenhotep II and another son, Menkheperre, and at least four daughters: Nebetiunet, Meryetamun (C), Meryetamun (D) and Iset.

Dates and length of reign

Thutmose III reigned from 1479 BC to 1425 BC according to the Low Chronology of Ancient Egypt. This has been the conventional Egyptian chronology in academic circles since the 1960s, though in some circles the older dates 1504 BC to 1450 BC are preferred from the High Chronology of Egypt. These dates, just as all the dates of the Eighteenth Dynasty, are open to dispute because of uncertainty about the circumstances surrounding the recording of a Heliacal Rise of Sothis in the reign of Amenhotep I. A papyrus from Amenhotep I's reign records this astronomical observation which theoretically could be used to perfectly correlate the Egyptian chronology with the modern calendar; however, to do this the latitude where the observation was taken must also be known. This document has no note of the place of observation, but it can safely be assumed that it was taken in either a Delta city, such as Memphis or Heliopolis, or in Thebes. These two latitudes give dates 20 years apart, the High and Low chronologies, respectively.

The length of Thutmose III's reign is known to the day thanks to information found in the tomb of the military commander Amenemheb-Mahu. Amenemheb-Mahu records Thutmose III's death to his master's 54th regnal year, on the 30th day of the third month of Peret. The day of Thutmose III's accession is known to be I Shemu day four, and astronomical observations can be used to establish the exact dates of the beginning and end of the king's reign (assuming the low chronology) from 28 April 1479 BC to 11 March 1425 BC respectively.

Thutmose's military campaigns

Widely considered a military genius by historians, Thutmose III conducted at least 16 campaigns in 20 years. He was an active expansionist ruler, sometimes called Egypt's greatest conqueror or "the Napoleon of Egypt" by the Egyptologist James Breasted. He is recorded to have captured 350 cities during his rule and conquered much of the Near East from the Euphrates to Nubia during seventeen known military campaigns. He was the first pharaoh after Thutmose I to cross the Euphrates, doing so during his campaign against Mitanni. His campaign records were inscribed onto the walls of the temple of Amun at Karnak (transcribed in Urkunden IV). He is consistently regarded as one of the greatest of Egypt's warrior pharaohs who transformed Egypt into an international superpower by creating an empire that stretched from the Asian regions of Syria to the North, to Upper Nubia to the south. Whether the Egyptian empire covered even more areas is less certain. Earlier Egyptologists, most recently Ed. Meyer, believed that Thutmose had also subjugated the islands of the Aegean Sea. This can no longer be upheld today. A conquest of Mesopotamia is unthinkable; and whether tribute sent from Alashia (Cyprus) was more than occasional gifts remains questionable. In most of his campaigns, his enemies were defeated town by town until they were beaten into submission. 

Much is known about Thutmose "the warrior" not only because of his military achievements, but also because of his royal scribe and army commander, Thanuny, who wrote about his conquests and reign. Thutmose III was able to conquer such a large number of lands because of revolutionary developments in military technology. The Hyksos may have brought advanced weaponry, such as horse-drawn chariots, around 1650 BC. In the process of driving them out, the people of Egypt learned to use these weapons. Thutmose III encountered little resistance from neighbouring kingdoms, allowing him to expand his realm of influence easily. His army also carried boats on dry land.

First Campaign

When Hatshepsut died on the 10th day of the sixth month of Thutmose III's 21st year, according to information from a single stela from Armant, the king of Kadesh advanced his army to Megiddo. Thutmose III mustered his own army and departed Egypt, passing through the border fortress of Tjaru (Sile) on the 25th day of the eighth month. Thutmose marched his troops through the coastal plain as far as Jamnia, then inland to Yehem, a small city near Megiddo, which he reached in the middle of the ninth month of the same year. The ensuing Battle of Megiddo probably was the largest battle of Thutmose's 17 campaigns. A ridge of mountains jutting inland from Mount Carmel stood between Thutmose and Megiddo and he had three potential routes to take. The northern route and the southern route, both of which went around the mountain, were judged by his council of war to be the safest, but Thutmose, in an act of great bravery (or so he boasts, but such self-praise is normal in Egyptian texts), accused the council of cowardice and took a dangerous route through the Aruna mountain pass, which he alleged was only wide enough for the army to pass "horse after horse and man after man."

Despite the laudatory nature of Thutmose's annals, such a pass does indeed exist, although not as narrow as Thutmose indicates, and taking it was a brilliant strategic move since when his army emerged from the pass they were situated on the plain of Esdraelon, directly between the rear of the Canaanite forces and Megiddo itself. For some reason, the Canaanite forces did not attack him as his army emerged, and his army routed them decisively. The size of the two forces is difficult to determine, but if, as Redford suggests, the amount of time it took to move the army through the pass may be used to determine the size of the Egyptian force, and if the number of sheep and goats captured may be used to determine the size of the Canaanite force, then both armies were around 10,000 men. Most scholars believe that the Egyptian army was more numerous. According to Thutmose III's Hall of Annals in the Temple of Amun at Karnak, the battle occurred on "Year 23, I Shemu [day] 21, the exact day of the feast of the new moon", a lunar date. This date corresponds to 9 May 1457 BC based on Thutmose III's accession in 1479 BC. After victory in battle, his troops stopped to plunder the enemy and the enemy was able to escape into Megiddo. Thutmose was forced to besiege the city, but he finally succeeded in conquering it after a siege of seven or eight months (see Battle of Megiddo (15th century BC)).

This campaign drastically changed the political situation in the ancient Near East. By taking Megiddo, Thutmose gained control of all of northern Canaan and the Syrian princes were obligated to send tribute and their own sons as hostages to Egypt. Beyond the Euphrates, the Assyrian, Babylonian and Hittite kings all gave Thutmose gifts, which he alleged to be "tribute" when he recorded it on the walls of Karnak. The only noticeable absence is Mitanni, which would bear the brunt of the following Egyptian campaigns into Western Asia.

Tours of Canaan and Syria

Thutmose's second, third and fourth campaigns appear to have been nothing more than tours of Syria and Canaan to collect tribute. Traditionally, the material directly after the text of the first campaign has been considered to be the second campaign. This text records tribute from the area which the Egyptians called Retjenu (roughly equivalent to Canaan) and it was also at this time that Assyria paid a second "tribute" to Thutmose III. It is probable that these texts come from Thutmose's 40th year or later and thus have nothing to do with the second campaign at all. If so, no records of this campaign have been found. Thutmose's third campaign was not considered significant enough to appear in his otherwise extensive Annals at Karnak. A survey was made of the animals and plants he found in Canaan, which was illustrated on the walls of a special room at Karnak. This survey is dated to Thutmose's 25th year. No record remains of Thutmose's fourth campaign, but at some point a fort was built in lower Lebanon and timber was cut for construction of a processional barque, and this probably fits best during this time frame.

Conquest of Syria
The fifth, sixth and seventh campaigns of Thutmose III were directed against the Phoenician cities in Syria and against Kadesh on the Orontes. In Thutmose's 29th year, he began his fifth campaign, where he first took an unknown city (the name falls in a lacuna) which had been garrisoned by Tunip. He then moved inland and took the city and territory around Ardata; the town was pillaged and the wheatfields burned. Unlike previous plundering raids, Thutmose III garrisoned the area known as Djahy, which is probably a reference to southern Syria. This permitted him to ship supplies and troops between Syria and Egypt. Although there is no direct evidence for it, it is for this reason that some have supposed that Thutmose's sixth campaign, in his thirtieth year, commenced with a naval transportation of troops directly to Byblos, bypassing Canaan entirely. After the troops arrived in Syria by whatever means, they proceeded into the Jordan River valley and moved north, pillaging Kadesh's lands. Turning west again, Thutmose took Simyra and quelled a rebellion in Ardata, which apparently had rebelled again. To stop such rebellions, Thutmose began taking hostages from the cities in Syria. The policy of these cities was driven by their elites, aligned to Mitanni and typically consisting of a king and a small number of foreign Maryannu. Thutmose III found that by taking family members of these key people to Egypt as hostages, he could drastically increase their loyalty to him. Syria rebelled again in Thutmose's 31st year and he returned to Syria for his seventh campaign, took the port city of Ullaza and the smaller Phoenician ports and took more measures to prevent further rebellions. All the excess grain which was produced in Syria was stored in the harbors he had recently conquered and was used for the support of the military and civilian Egyptian presence ruling Syria. This left the cities in Syria desperately impoverished. With their economies in ruins, they had no means of funding a rebellion.

Attack on Mitanni
After Thutmose III had taken control of the Syrian cities, the obvious target for his eighth campaign was the state of Mitanni, a Hurrian country with an Indo-Aryan ruling class. However, to reach Mitanni, he had to cross the Euphrates River. He sailed directly to Byblos and made boats which he took with him over land on what appeared to otherwise be just another tour of Syria, and he proceeded with the usual raiding and pillaging as he moved north through the lands he had already taken. He continued north through the territory belonging to the still unconquered cities of Aleppo and Carchemish and quickly crossed the Euphrates in his boats, taking the Mitannian king entirely by surprise. It appears that Mitanni was not expecting an invasion, so they had no army of any kind ready to defend against Thutmose, although their ships on the Euphrates did try to defend against the Egyptian crossing. Thutmose III then went freely from city to city and pillaged them while the nobles hid in caves, or at least this is the typically propagandistic way Egyptian records chose to record it. During this period of no opposition, Thutmose put up a second stele commemorating his crossing of the Euphrates next to the stele his grandfather, Thutmose I, had put up several decades earlier. A militia was raised to fight the invaders, but it fared very poorly. Thutmose III then returned to Syria by way of Niy, where he records that he engaged in an elephant hunt. He collected tribute from foreign powers and returned to Egypt in victory.

Tours of Syria

Thutmose III returned to Syria for his ninth campaign in his 34th year, but this appears to have been just a raid of the area called Nukhashshe, a region populated by semi-nomadic people. The plunder recorded is minimal, so it was probably just a minor raid. Records from his 10th campaign indicate much more fighting. By Thutmose's 35th year, the king of Mitanni had raised a large army and engaged the Egyptians around Aleppo. As usual for any Egyptian king, Thutmose boasted a total crushing victory, but this statement is suspect due to the very small amount of plunder taken. Thutmose's annals at Karnak indicate he only took a total of 10 prisoners of war. He may have fought the Mitannians to a stalemate, yet he did receive tribute from the Hittites after that campaign, which seems to indicate the outcome of the battle was in Thutmose's favor.

The details about his next two campaigns are unknown. His 11th is presumed to have happened in his 36th regnal year and his 12th is presumed to have happened in his 37th year since his 13th is mentioned at Karnak as happening in his 38th regnal year. Part of the tribute list for his 12th campaign remains immediately before his 13th begins, and the contents recorded, specifically wild game and certain minerals of uncertain identification, might indicate that it took place on the steppe around Nukhashshe, but this remains mere speculation.

In his 13th campaign, Thutmose returned to Nukhashshe for a very minor campaign. His 14th campaign, waged during his 39th year, was against the Shasu. The location of this campaign is impossible to determine since the Shasu were nomads who could have lived anywhere from Lebanon to the Transjordan to Edom. After this campaign, the numbers given by Thutmose's scribes to his campaigns all fall in lacunae, so they can only be counted by date. In his 40th year, tribute was collected from foreign powers, but it is unknown if this was considered a campaign (i.e. if the king went with it or if it was led by an official). Only the tribute list remains from Thutmose's next campaign, and nothing may be deduced about it except that it was probably another raid to the frontiers around Niy. His final Asian campaign is better documented. Sometime before Thutmose's 42nd year, Mitanni apparently began spreading revolt among all the major cities in Syria. Thutmose moved his troops by land up the coastal road and put down rebellions in the Arka plain ("Arkantu" in Thutmose's chronicle) and moved on Tunip. After taking Tunip, his attention turned to Kadesh again. He engaged and destroyed three surrounding Mitannian garrisons and returned to Egypt in victory. His victory in this final campaign was neither complete nor permanent since he did not take Kadesh, and Tunip could not have remained aligned to him for very long, certainly not beyond his own death. This victory however, must have had quite an impact, for the next tribute lists include Adana, a Cilician city.

Nubian campaign
Thutmose's last campaign was waged in his 50th regnal year. He attacked Nubia, but only went so far as the fourth cataract of the Nile. Although no king of Egypt had ever penetrated so far with an army, previous kings' campaigns had spread Egyptian culture that far already, and the earliest Egyptian document found at Gebel Barkal dates from three years before Thutmose's campaign.

Monumental construction
Thutmose III was a great builder and constructed over 50 temples, although some of these are now lost and only mentioned in written records. He also commissioned the building of many tombs for nobles, which were made with greater craftsmanship than ever before. His reign was also a period of great stylistic changes in the sculpture, paintings and reliefs associated with construction, much of it beginning during the reign of Hatshepsut.

Artistic developments

Thutmose's architects and artisans showed great continuity with the formal style of previous kings, but several developments set him apart from his predecessors. Although he followed the traditional relief styles for most of his reign, after his 42nd year he began having himself depicted wearing the red crown of Lower Egypt and a šndyt-kilt, an unprecedented style. Architecturally, his use of pillars also was unprecedented. He built Egypt's only known set of heraldic pillars, two large columns standing alone instead of being part of a set supporting the roof. His jubilee hall was also revolutionary and is arguably the earliest known building created in the basilica style. Thutmose's artisans achieved new heights of skill in painting, and tombs from his reign were the earliest to be entirely painted instead of painted reliefs. Although not directly pertaining to his monuments, it appears that Thutmose's artisans had learned glass making skills, developed in the early 18th Dynasty, to create drinking vessels by the core-formed method.

Karnak
Thutmose dedicated far more attention to Karnak than any other site. In the Iput-isut, the temple proper in the center, he rebuilt the hypostyle hall of his grandfather Thutmose I, dismantled the red chapel of Hatshepsut, built Pylon VI, a shrine for the bark of Amun in its place, and built an antechamber in front of it, the ceiling of which was supported by his heraldic pillars. He built a temenos wall around the central chapel containing smaller chapels, along with workshops and storerooms. East of the main sanctuary, he built a jubilee hall in which to celebrate his Sed festival. The main hall was built in basilica style with rows of pillars supporting the ceiling on each side of the aisle. The central two rows were higher than the others to create windows where the ceiling was split. Two of the smaller rooms in this temple contained the reliefs of the survey of the plants and animals of Canaan which he took in his third campaign.

East of the Iput-Isut, he erected another temple to Aten, where he was depicted as being supported by Amun. It was inside this temple that Thutmose planned on erecting his tekhen waty, or "unique obelisk." The tekhen waty was designed to stand alone instead as part of a pair and is the tallest obelisk ever successfully cut. It was not, however, erected until Thutmose IV raised it 35 years later. It was later moved to Rome by Emperor Constantius II and is now known as the Lateran Obelisk.

In 390 AD, Christian Roman Emperor Theodosius I re-erected another obelisk from the Temple of Karnak in the Hippodrome of Constantinople, now known as the Obelisk of Theodosius. Thus, two obelisks of Tuthmosis III's Karnak temple stand in Papal Rome and in Caesaropapist Constantinople, the two main historical capitals of the Roman Empire.

Thutmose also undertook building projects to the south of the main temple between the sanctuary of Amun and the temple of Mut. Immediately to the south of the main temple, he built the seventh pylon on the north–south road which entered the temple between the fourth and fifth pylons. It was built for use during his jubilee and was covered with scenes of defeated enemies. He set royal colossi on both sides of the pylon and put two more obelisks on the south face in front of the gateway. The eastern obelisk's base remains in place, but the western obelisk was transported to the Hippodrome in Constantinople. Farther south along the road, he put up Pylon VIII, which Hatshepsut had begun. East of the road, he dug a sacred lake of 250 by 400 feet and placed another alabaster bark shrine near it. He commissioned royal artists to depict his extensive collections of fauna and flora in the Botanical garden of Thutmosis III.

Defacing of Hatshepsut's monuments

For many years, egyptologists theorized that following the death of Thutmose II, Hatshepsut 'usurped' the throne from Thutmose III. Although Thutmose III was a co-regent during this time, early historians have speculated that Thutmose III never forgave his stepmother for denying him access to the throne for the first two decades of his reign. However, in recent times this theory has been revised after questions arose as to why Hatshepsut would have allowed a resentful heir to control armies, which it is known she did. This view is supported further by the fact that no strong evidence has been found to show Thutmose III sought to claim the throne. He kept Hatshepsut's religious and administrative leaders. Added to this is the fact that the monuments of Hatshepsut were not damaged until at least 25 years after her death, late in the reign of Thutmose III when he was quite elderly. He was in another coregency, this one with his son, who would become Amenhotep II, who is known to have attempted to identify the works of Hatshepsut as his own. Additionally, Thutmose III's mortuary temple was built directly next to Hatshepsut's, an act that would have been unlikely to occur if Thutmose III bore a grudge against her.

After her death, many of Hatshepsut's monuments and depictions were subsequently defaced or destroyed, including those in her famous mortuary temple complex at Deir el-Bahri. Traditionally, these have been interpreted by early modern scholars to be evidence of acts of damnatio memoriae (condemning a person by erasure from recorded existence) by Thutmose III. However, recent research by scholars such as Charles Nims and Peter Dorman has re-examined these erasures and found that the acts of erasure which could be dated only began some time during year 46 or 47 of Thutmose's reign (c. 1433/2 BC). Another often overlooked fact is that Hatshepsut was not the only one who received this treatment. The monuments of her chief steward, Senenmut, who was closely associated with her rule, were similarly defaced where they were found. All of this evidence casts serious doubt upon the popular theory that Thutmose III ordered the destruction in a fit of vengeful rage shortly after his accession.

Currently, the purposeful destruction of the memory of Hatshepsut is seen as a measure designed to ensure a smooth succession for the son of Thutmose III, the future Amenhotep II, as opposed to any of the surviving relatives of Hatshepsut who had an equal or better claim to the throne. It also may be likely that this measure could not have been taken until the deaths of powerful religious and administrative officials who had served under both Hatshepsut and Thutmose III. Later, Amenhotep II even claimed that he had built the items he defaced.

Death and burial

Thutmose's tomb (KV34) was discovered by Victor Loret in 1898 in the Valley of the Kings. It uses a plan which is typical of 18th Dynasty tombs, with a sharp turn at the vestibule preceding the burial chamber. Two stairways and two corridors provide access to the vestibule, which is preceded by a quadrangular shaft or "well".

A complete version of Amduat, an important New Kingdom funerary text, is in the vestibule, making it the first tomb where Egyptologists found the complete text. The burial chamber, which is supported by two pillars, is oval-shaped and its ceiling decorated with stars, symbolizing the cave of the deity Sokar. In the middle lies a large red quartzite sarcophagus in the shape of a cartouche. On the two pillars in the middle of the chamber there are passages from the Litanies of Re, a text that celebrates the later sun deity, who is identified with the pharaoh at this time. On the other pillar is a unique image depicting Thutmosis III being suckled by the goddess Isis in the guise of the tree.

The wall decorations are executed in a simple "diagrammatic" way, imitating the manner of the cursive script one might expect to see on a funerary papyrus rather than the more typically lavish wall decorations seen on most other royal tomb walls. The colouring is similarly muted, executed in simple black figures accompanied by text on a cream background with highlights in red and pink. The decorations depict the pharaoh aiding the deities in defeating Apep, the serpent of chaos, thereby helping to ensure the daily rebirth of the sun as well as the pharaoh's own resurrection.

According to the American Egyptologist Peter Der Manuelian, a statement in the tomb biography of an official named Amenemheb establishes that Thutmose III died in Year 54, III Peret day 30 of his reign after ruling Egypt for "53 years, 10 months and 26 days" (Urk. 180.15). Thutmose III died one month and four days shy of the start of his 54th regnal year. When the co-regencies with Hatshepsut and Amenhotep II are deducted, he ruled alone as pharaoh for just over 30 of those years.

Mummy

Thutmose III's mummy was discovered in the Deir el-Bahri Cache above the Mortuary Temple of Hatshepsut in 1881. He was interred along with those of other 18th and 19th Dynasty leaders Ahmose I, Amenhotep I, Thutmose I, Thutmose II, Ramesses I, Seti I, Ramesses II and Ramesses IX, as well as the 21st Dynasty pharaohs Pinedjem I, Pinedjem II and Siamun.

While it is popularly thought that his mummy originally was unwrapped by Gaston Maspero in 1886, it was in fact first unwrapped by Émile Brugsch, the Egyptologist who supervised the evacuation of the mummies from the Deir el-Bahri Cache in 1881. It was unwrapped soon after its arrival in the Boulak Museum while Maspero was away in France, and the Director General of the Egyptian Antiquities Service ordered the mummy re-wrapped. So when it was "officially" unwrapped by Maspero in 1886, he almost certainly knew it was in relatively poor condition.

The mummy had been damaged extensively in antiquity by tomb robbers and its wrappings subsequently cut into and torn by the Rassul family, who had rediscovered the tomb and its contents only a few years before. Maspero's description of the body provides an idea as to the magnitude of the damage done:
His mummy was not securely hidden away, for towards the close of the 20th dynasty it was torn out of the coffin by robbers, who stripped it and rifled it of the jewels with which it was covered, injuring it in their haste to carry away the spoil. It was subsequently re-interred, and has remained undisturbed until the present day; but before re-burial some renovation of the wrappings was necessary, and as portions of the body had become loose, the restorers, in order to give the mummy the necessary firmness, compressed it between four oar-shaped slips of wood, painted white, and placed, three inside the wrappings and one outside, under the bands which confined the winding-sheet.

Of the face, which was undamaged, Maspero says the following:
Happily the face, which had been plastered over with pitch at the time of embalming, did not suffer at all from this rough treatment, and appeared intact when the protecting mask was removed. Its appearance does not answer to our ideal of the conqueror. His statues, though not representing him as a type of manly beauty, yet give him refined, intelligent features, but a comparison with the mummy shows that the artists have idealised their model. The forehead is abnormally low, the eyes deeply sunk, the jaw heavy, the lips thick, and the cheek-bones extremely prominent; the whole recalling the physiognomy of Thûtmosis II, though with a greater show of energy.

Maspero was so disheartened at the state of the mummy and the prospect that all of the other mummies were similarly damaged (as it turned out, few were in so poor a state) that he would not unwrap another for several years.

Unlike many other examples from the Deir el-Bahri Cache, the wooden mummiform coffin that contained the body was original to the pharaoh, though any gilding or decoration it might have had had been hacked off in antiquity.

In 1980, James Harris and Edward F. Wente conducted X-ray examinations of New Kingdom Pharaoh's crania and skeletal remains, which included the mummified remains of Thutmose III. The authors determined that the royal mummies of the 18th Dynasty bore strong similarities to contemporary Nubians with slight differences. 

In his examination of the mummy, the anatomist Grafton Elliot Smith stated the height of Thutmose III's mummy to be , but the mummy was missing its feet, so Thutmose III was undoubtedly taller than the figure given by Smith. The mummy of Thutmose III resided in the Royal Mummies Hall of the Museum of Egyptian Antiquities, catalog number CG 61068, until April 2021 when his mummy was moved to National Museum of Egyptian Civilization along with those of 17 other kings and four queens in an event termed the Pharaohs' Golden Parade.

See also
Cleopatra's Needles
History of ancient Egypt
Eighteenth Dynasty of Egypt family tree

References

Further reading
Eloise Jarvis McGraw, "Mara, Daughter of the Nile"

Der Manuelian, Peter, Studies in the Reign of Amenophis II, Hildesheimer Ägyptologische Beiträge(HÄB) Verlag: 1987
Cline, Eric H. and O'Connor, David, Thutmose III : A New Biography, University of Michigan Press, 2006. , incorporates a number of important new survey articles regarding the reign of Thutmose III, including administration, art, religion and foreign affairs
Reisinger, Magnus, Entwicklung der ägyptischen Königsplastik in der frühen und hohen 18. Dynastie, Agnus-Verlag, Münster 2005, 
Breasted, James Henry. Ancient Records of Egypt, [Volume Two, The Eighteenth Dynasty], University of Illinois Press, 2001. 
River God by Smith, Wilbur along with the rest of his Egyptian series of historical fiction novels are based in a large part on Thutmose III's time along with his story and that of his mother through the eyes of his mother's vizier mixing in elements of the Hyksos' domination and eventual overthrow.

External links

A Short History of Ancient Egypt -Dynasties XVIII to XX, with a few Thutmoside documents translated.
Hatshepsut: from Queen to Pharaoh, an exhibition catalog from The Metropolitan Museum of Art (fully available online as PDF), which contains material on Thutmose III (see index)

 
15th-century BC births
15th-century BC deaths
15th-century BC Pharaohs
Pharaohs of the Eighteenth Dynasty of Egypt
Ancient child monarchs
Ancient Egyptian mummies